The Fatima Khatun Mosque (also known as the Great Mosque of Jenin) is the main mosque of the Palestinian city of Jenin in the northern West Bank. Adjacent to the mosque is the still-active Fatima Khatun Girls' School.

History
A ruined mosque dating back to 636 CE stood on the site of the modern-day mosque. It was renovated during the Mamluk era in the 14th-century, but again fell into ruin.

The existing structure was founded in 1566 by Fatima Khatun, the wife of Lala Kara Mustafa Pasha, the Bosnian governor of Damascus during the reign of Ottoman sultan Suleiman the Magnificent. Fatima Khatun paid regular visits to the area, but took a particular liking to Jenin while traveling towards Jerusalem for pilgrimage. In the center of Jenin, she decided to have the building established atop the remains of the old mosque. Numerous religious trusts (waqf) including a local public bath (hamaam) and many of the nearby shops were designated to fund the Fatima Khatun Mosque thereafter.

Today, it serves as Jenin's largest mosque.

References

Religious buildings and structures completed in 1566
Mosques in the West Bank
Ottoman mosques
Buildings and structures in Jenin